Jan Bogumił Sokołowski (24 May 1899 – 7 April 1982) was a Polish zoologist who worked as a professor at the University of Poznan who was a specialist in ornithology and studied the birds of Poland and made efforts for their conservation. He was also a talented artist and a writer of popular articles which included his own illustrations.

Early life and education
Sokołowski was born in Dakowy Mokre near Buk in a wealthy family, the son of local administrator Alekse and Zofia née Gintrowicz. He completed his matriculation from Poznan and then went to study art at the State School. An uncle Zygmunt was an artist. He joined the insurgents during the Greater Poland uprising (1918–19). In 1921 he began to study biology, geography, and geology at the University of Poznan. He received a high school teaching diploma and a master's degree in philosophy with a thesis on the histology of the intestinal track of song birds in 1925. While a student, he worked as an illustrator and specimen preparator at the Department of Zoology. He then studied the orthoptera of the region and obtained a doctoral degree.

Career

Sokolowski taught nature studies at the Cadet Corps between 1927 and 1937. During this period he designed a nest box for which he obtained a patent. "Sokolowski boxes" were manufactured by the Rawicz prison. He then studied the birds of Poland and habilitated in ornithology in 1936. During World War II he lived with his family in Jędrzejów and Zagnańsk near Kielce and spent time on collection trips into the Zagnańsk region and the Świętokrzyskie Mountains. In 1946 he obtained a post-doctoral degree for studies on the skull of songbirds. He joined the University of Poznan and became an associate professor in 1948 and became a full professor in 1955.

Sokołowski published nearly 200 papers and numerous books. He died at Poznan and is buried in the parish cemetery of St. Jan Vianney.

References 

Polish ornithologists
1889 births
1982 deaths
20th-century Polish zoologists
Member of the Tomasz Zan Society